Robert Ayers (born September 6, 1985) is a former American football defensive end that played 10 years in the NFL. He played college football at Tennessee and was drafted by the Denver Broncos in the first round of the 2009 NFL Draft. He has also played for the New York Giants and Tampa Bay Buccaneers.

Early years
Ayers was born in Jersey City, New Jersey where he attended the Sacred Heart School until the eighth grade. He spent part of his freshman year at Hoboken High School in 1999–2000 before moving to Clio, South Carolina, where attended Marlboro County High School in Bennettsville. He was an All-State linebacker and was selected to play in the 2003 Shrine Bowl as a senior. That season, he recorded 112 tackles and intercepted five passes. As a junior, he had 94 tackles, eight sacks, and three interceptions. In addition to football, he also lettered twice in track as a sprinter, running the 100-meter dash and  4 x 100 metres relay.

College career
Ayers began at the University of Tennessee as a redshirt outside linebacker in 2004. As a sophomore, he moved to defensive end and was a backup, recording five tackles and one sack. In 2006, he once again was a backup, totaling 25 tackles and one sack. In 2007, Ayers was once again a backup, but led the team with four sacks and 12 tackles for losses. He also had 34 tackles, two pass breakups and four quarterback pressures. As a senior in 2008 Ayers became a starter at right defensive end, recording 49 tackles,  three sacks, and a team and league leading 15.5 tackles for losses. He also had six pressures and an interception.

Professional career

Denver Broncos
Ayers was drafted by the Denver Broncos as the second one of their two first round picks at 18th overall of the 2009 NFL Draft. The Broncos drafted Ayers with the first round pick that was traded from the Chicago Bears in exchange for Jay Cutler. On August 4, 2009, Ayers signed a five-year contract with $9.7 million guaranteed. In his rookie season, he recorded 19 tackles and no sacks. He recorded his first professional sack in week 1 of the 2010 season against David Garrard of the Jacksonville Jaguars.

Ayers's second season was a bit of a disappointment to fans who were hoping for high production from the former first-round draft selection.  In 2010, Ayers started in ten games as an outside linebacker and recorded 39 tackles and 1.5 sacks.

During the 2011 offseason, Ayers and rookie linebacker Nate Irving swapped jersey numbers (giving Ayers No. 91 and Irving No. 56—Ayers' former number).  After a brief legal dispute with Reebok, Ayers eventually got to wear No. 91, which was his college number.  “Fifty-six was a nice number,” said Ayers, “but I kind of see this as a new beginning for me.  We’ve got a new coaching staff, and I want to get back to my roots.”

With a new number and new position (moved from outside linebacker to defensive end, his more-natural position), Ayers was looking to improve in his third season.  Starting in 13 games, Ayers recorded 39 tackles and 3.0 sacks (all career highs) while showing improvement against the run.  Ayers spent time at defensive end in Denver's base 4-3 defense and rotated to defensive tackle in certain nickel defensive sets during the 2011 season.

Ayers began the 2012 season as a backup under new defensive coordinator Jack Del Rio.

In the 2013 season, the Broncos reached Super Bowl XLVIII, but fell to the Seattle Seahawks, 43–8. Ayers recorded one tackle in the game.

New York Giants
Ayers signed a two-year, $4 million contract with the New York Giants on April 2, 2014. He was placed on season ending injured reserve on December 2, 2014, after suffering a torn pectoral muscle. In 2015, Ayers set a career record for sacks and led all Giants players in that category with 9.5 sacks despite missing 4 games.

Tampa Bay Buccaneers
On March 12, 2016, Ayers agreed to a three-year, $21 million contract with the Tampa Bay Buccaneers. On September 11, Ayers recorded a sack in his Buccaneers debut, bringing down Matt Ryan in a 31–24 win over the Atlanta Falcons. Ayers was sidelined for five weeks due to an ankle injury. On November 13, he recorded a season-high 1.5 sacks and five tackles, as well as forcing fumble in the end zone, resulting as a safety in a 36-10 blowout win over the Chicago Bears. Ayers wrapped up his first year as a Buccaneer with 6.5 sacks, 29 tackles, and a forced fumble.

On October 22, 2017, Ayers brought down his first sack of the season, dropping Tyrod Taylor in a 27–30 loss to the Buffalo Bills. On November 5, Ayers recorded a strip-sack against the New Orleans Saints. He missed Week 12 & 13 due to a concussion. Ayers played two more games, but missed the rest of the season with a shoulder injury. He finished the season with two sacks, 31 tackles, and two forced fumbles.

On March 17, 2018, Ayers was released by the Buccaneers.

Detroit Lions
On August 27, 2018, Ayers signed a one-year contract with the Detroit Lions, but was released the next day.

Retirement
After sitting out the entire 2018 season, Ayers announced his retirement on July 16, 2019.

Coaching
• 2021 season Defensive Coordinator at Knoxville Catholic High School (Knoxville, Tennessee). 
• 2022 season Defensive Coordinator at Oak Ridge High School (Oak Ridge, Tennessee).
</p>

Career statistics

Key
 GP: games played
 COMB: combined tackles
 TOTAL: total tackles
 AST: assisted tackles
 SACK: sacks
 FF: forced fumbles
 FR: fumble recoveries
 FR YDS: fumble return yards 
 INT: interceptions
 IR YDS: interception return yards
 AVG IR: average interception return
 LNG: longest interception return
 TD: interceptions returned for touchdown
 PD: passes defensed

References

External links
Tampa Bay Buccaneers bio
New York Giants bio 
Denver Broncos bio 
Tennessee Volunteers bio

1985 births
Living people
American football defensive ends
American football outside linebackers
Denver Broncos players
Detroit Lions players
Hoboken High School alumni
New York Giants players
People from Clio, South Carolina
Players of American football from Jersey City, New Jersey
Players of American football from South Carolina
Tampa Bay Buccaneers players
Tennessee Volunteers football players